Run is a 1991 American action thriller film directed by Geoff Burrowes and starring Patrick Dempsey and Kelly Preston.

Plot
Boston law student and part-time mechanic Charlie Farrow (Patrick Dempsey) was asked by his boss to deliver a new Porsche from Boston to Atlantic City for a client. When he gets close to Atlantic City, the Porsche breaks down.

While Charlie waits for the car to be repaired, a cab driver (who mistakes Charlie for being an Atlantic City high roller) takes him to an undercover casino that has a bar room and kitchen, so Charlie can get something to eat.

At the casino, Charlie earns the wrath of Denny Halloran (Alan C. Peterson), who takes exception to Charlie beating him at poker. In the resulting fight, Denny trips over a potted palm, accidentally hits his head on the sharp corner of a counter, and dies.

Charlie is now on the spot, because Denny happens to be the son of a mob boss named Matt Halloran (Ken Pogue), who is the owner and despot of the casino and most of the police force, including Chief Travers and Lt. Martins who think Charlie could be innocent.

Wrongfully accused of murdering Denny, Charlie finds himself on the run from both dirty cops and Matt's henchmen, all of whom want to collect the $50,000 bounty that Matt placed on Charlie. With only one ally, reluctant witness Karen Landers (Kelly Preston) who knows the truth and agrees to aid Charlie, Charlie finds himself in a deadly game of cat and mouse.

The bodies pile up as Charlie dodges flying bullets and bowling pins, explosions from numerous assault weapons and miscellaneous shrapnel and twisted auto parts as he is pursued on a nightmare race through racetracks, amusement parks, bowling alleys and shopping malls by Matt's men, corrupt cops and Travers and Martins.

After Karen is wounded and two dirty cops die chasing him Charlie surrenders himself to Travers and Martins but they are pursued by two of Matt's men, Sammy and Marv, and run off the road, Travers is killed and Martins is injured. Sammy and Marv take Charlie to Matt who tells them to kill Charlie, however, he kills Marv then Sammy by causing them to fall off of a roof. After killing Matt's other henchmen, Charlie and Matt confront each other at Matt's dog-race track. Matt dies as he is impaled by a mechanical pacer rabbit that was speeding toward him. Martins arrives after this and tells Charlie that "they sure fooled with the wrong guy", before placing a reassuring hand on Charlie's shoulder.

Cast
 Patrick Dempsey as Charlie Farrow
 Kelly Preston as Karen Landers
 Ken Pogue as Matt Halloran
 A.C. Peterson as Denny Halloran
 James Kidnie as Sammy
 Sean McCann as Marv
 Michael MacRae as Officer O'Rourke 
 Tom McBeath as Officer Smithy
 Marc Strange as Chief Travers
 Christopher Lawford as Lieutenant Martins 
 William S. Taylor as Sergeant Halsey
 Jerry Wasserman as Halloran's Lieutenant
 Steve Adams as Frank
 Jonathan Bruce as Bill, Security Guard
 Peter Williams as  Cab Driver Maurice
 Lochlyn Munro as College Buddy
 Michael Rogers as Electrocuted Gunman
 Gerry Bean as Cop At Karen's 
 Garry Davey as Sergeant At Karen's
 Suleka Mathew as Casino Cashier
 Babz Chula as Poker Player
 Alex Diakun as Casino Maitre D'

Production
It was the second feature directed by Geoff Burrowes."If you want to do an action picture, it should be one that doesn't let up and for that reason this movie appealed to me enormously," he said. "In Run, we're projecting a situation which could quite conceivably happen to any member of the audience, a situation with which they can identify through a character who is fundamentally Everyman. We pose the question, `What would happen to me if I were caught up something in which I was an outsider, where all due process fell away and I were left alone?' "

Filming started in Vancouver in April 1990.

Kelly Preston replaced Tracy Pollan who bowed out during early filming in May. According to a publicist, "The part had evolved and both parties agreed that she was no longer right for the role. There were no awful tantrums."

References

External links

1991 films
Hollywood Pictures films
1991 crime thriller films
1991 action thriller films
Films about gambling
Films set in Massachusetts
Films shot in Portland, Oregon
American chase films
American action thriller films
American crime thriller films
1990s chase films
Films about organized crime in the United States
Films set in Atlantic City, New Jersey
1990s English-language films
1990s American films